In neurology, retrograde amnesia (RA) is a loss of memory-access to events that occurred or information that was learned in the past. It is caused by an injury or the onset of a disease. It tends to negatively affect episodic, autobiographical, and declarative memory, while keeping procedural memory intact without increasing difficulty for learning new information. RA can be temporally graded, or more permanent based on the severity of its cause. It is usually consistent with Ribot's law. The law states that subjects are more likely to lose memories closer to the traumatic incident than more memories that happened further from the incident. The type of information that is forgotten can range from a specific memory, such as a single event, or a more general memory. This would resemble generic amnesia. Anterograde amnesia is a similar condition that deals with the inability to form new memories following the onset of an injury or disease.

Cause
RA commonly results from damage to regions of the brain that are associated with episodic and declarative memory, including autobiographical information. In extreme cases, individuals may completely forget who they are. Generally, this is a more severe type of amnesia known as global, or generalized amnesia. However, memory loss can also be selective or categorical, manifested by a person's inability to remember events related to a specific incident or topic. Patients also differ in durations of RA (how long they can't recall information) and durations of what is forgotten (past time frame for which information is unavailable).

Temporally graded retrograde amnesia
In temporally graded retrograde amnesia, patients eventually recover most memories following the onset of RA. This suggests that the hippocampal formation/ consolidation, the process of coding new information, is only used in systematic consolidation for temporary storage, and short periods of time. Systemic consolidation then moves the information and long-term consolidation takes place in other brain structures. The fact that damage to the hippocampal formation can eventually overcome RA suggests that other brain structures are able to take over the jobs of the malfunctioning regions. RA can also progress and further deteriorate memory recollection, as in the case of Korsakoff syndrome and Alzheimer's disease, due to the ongoing nature of the damage caused by the illnesses. The degree to which different patients recover from RA differs in time (some take a few days while others a few decades) and content (some will only remember certain specific instances while others more).

Focal, isolated, and pure retrograde amnesia
Focal isolated, and pure retrograde amnesia are terms used to describe a pure form of RA, with an absence of anterograde amnesia (AA). In addition, Focal RA in particular, has also been used to describe a RA situation in which there is a lack of observable physical deficit as well. This could be described as a psychogenic form of amnesia with mild anterograde and retrograde loss. A case study of DH revealed that the patient was unable to provide personal or public information, however there was no parahippocampal or entorhinal damage found. Individuals with focal brain damage have minimal RA.

Isolated RA is associated with a visible thalamic lesion. Consistent with other forms of RA, the isolated form is marked by the inability to recall past information.

Pure retrograde amnesia (PRA) refers to the behavioral syndrome that is characterized by the inability to retrieve remote information in the face of a normal ability to learn new information, with no other ecological or psychometric evidence of cognitive impairment. It should not be confused with brief periods of peritraumatic amnesia that are common in mild concussive head traumas. The findings of pure retrograde amnesia have helped form the dissociation between mechanisms for RA and AA. Several studies have found numerous causes for PRA like vascular diseases, head traumas ranging from mild to severe, encephalitis, as well as purely psychological conditions and totally unidentifiable etiologies. Most people who have PRA can function normally and learn new information

A pure form of RA is rare as most cases of RA co-occur with AA. A famous example is that of patient ML. The patient's MRI revealed damage to the right ventral frontal cortex and underlying white matter, including the uncinate fasciculus, a band of fibers previously thought to mediate retrieval of specific events from one's personal past.

During consolidation, the hippocampus acts as an intermediate tool that quickly stores new information until it is transferred to the neocortex for the long-term. The temporal lobe, which holds the hippocampus, entorhinal, perirhinal and parahippocampal cortices, has a reciprocal connection with the neocortex. The temporal lobe is temporarily needed when consolidating new information; as the learning becomes stronger, the neocortex becomes more independent of the temporal lobe.

Studies on specific cases demonstrate how particular impaired areas of the hippocampus are associated with the severity of RA. Damage can be limited to the CA1 field of the hippocampus, causing very limited RA for about one to two years. More extensive damage limited to the hippocampus causes temporally graded amnesia for 15 to 25 years. Another study suggests that large medial temporal lobe lesions, that extend laterally to include other regions, produce more extensive RA, covering 40 to 50 years. These findings suggest that density of RA becomes more severe and long-term as the damage extends beyond the hippocampus to surrounding structures.

The common studied causes of RA do not always lead to the onset of RA. It may even be that in some cases both conscious feigning and unconscious processes are at play.

Traumatic brain injury (TBI) or post-traumatic amnesia
Traumatic brain injury (TBI), also known as post-traumatic amnesia, occurs from an external force that causes structural damage to the brain, such as a sharp blow to the head, a diffuse axonal injury, or childhood brain damage (e.g., shaken baby syndrome). In cases of sudden rapid acceleration, the brain continues moving around in the skull, harming brain tissue as it hits internal protrusions.

TBI varies according to impact of external forces, location of structural damage, and severity of damage ranging from mild to severe. Retrograde amnesia can be one of the many consequences of brain injury but it is important to note that it is not always the outcome of TBI. An example of a subgroup of people who are often exposed to TBI are individuals who are involved in high-contact sports. Research on football players takes a closer look at some of the implications to their high-contact activities. Enduring consistent head injuries can have an effect on the neural consolidation of memory.

Specific cases, such as that of patient ML, support the evidence that severe blows to the head can cause the onset of RA. In this specific case there was an onset of isolated RA following a severe head injury. The brain damage did not affect the person's ability to form new memories. Therefore, the idea that specific sections of retrograde memory are independent of anterograde is supported. Normally, there is a very gradual recovery, however, a dense period of amnesia immediately preceding the trauma usually persists.

Traumatic events
RA can occur without any anatomical damage to the brain, lacking an observable neurobiological basis. Primarily referred to as psychogenic amnesia or psychogenic fugue, it often occurs due to a traumatic situation that individuals wish to consciously or unconsciously avoid through intrapsychic conflicts or unconscious repressions. The onset of psychogenic amnesia can be either global (i.e., individual forgets all history) or situation specific (i.e., individual is unable to retrieve memories of specific situations).

Patients experiencing psychogenic amnesia have impaired episodic memory, instances of wandering and traveling, and acceptance of a new identity as a result of inaccessible memories pertaining to their previous identity.

Recent research has begun to investigate the effects of stress and fear-inducing situations with the onset of RA. Long-term potentiation (LTP) is the process by which there is a signal transmission between neurons after the activation of a neuron, which has been known to play a strong role in the hippocampus in learning and memory. Common changes in the hippocampus have been found to be related to stress and induced LTP. The commonalities support the idea that variations of stress can play a role in producing new memories as well as the onset of RA for other memories. The amygdala plays a crucial role in memory and can be affected by emotional stimuli, evoking RA.

Studies of specific cases, such as 'AMN', support evidence  of traumatic experiences as a plausible cause of RA. AMN escaped a small fire in his house, did not inhale any smoke, and had no brain damage. Nevertheless, he was unable to recall autobiographical knowledge the next day. This case shows that RA can occur in the absence of structural brain damage.

After a traumatic head injury, emotional disturbances can occur at three different levels: neurological, reactionary, and long-term disturbances. Neurological disturbances can change emotional and motivational responses. Reactionary disturbances effect emotional and motivational responses as well, but reflect the failure to cope with environmental demands. Someone with this might withdraw from the environment that they are placed in because they no longer know how to handle the cognitive resources.

Nutritional deficiency
RA has been found among alcohol-dependent patients who have Korsakoff's syndrome. Korsakoff's syndrome patients develop retrograde amnesia due to a thiamine deficiency (lack of vitamin B1). Also, chronic alcohol use disorders are associated with a decrease in the volume of the left and right hippocampus.

These patients' regular diet consists mostly of hard alcohol intake, which lacks the necessary nutrients for typical development and maintenance. Therefore, after a prolonged time consuming primarily alcohol, these people undergo memory difficulties and ultimately develop RA. However, some of the drawbacks of using Korsakoff patients to study RA is the progressive nature of the illness and the unknown time of onset.

Infections
Infections that pass the blood–brain barrier can cause brain damage (encephalitis), sometimes resulting in the onset of RA. In the case of patient 'SS', the infection led to focal or isolated retrograde amnesia where there was an absence of or limited AA. Brain scans show abnormalities in the bilateral medial temporal lobes, including two thirds of the hippocampal formation and the posterior part of the amygdala.

Surgery
Henry Molaison had epilepsy that progressed and worsened by his late twenties. The severity of his condition caused him to undergo surgery in an effort to prevent his seizures. Unfortunately, due to a lack of overall known neurological knowledge, Molaison's surgeons removed his bilateral medial temporal lobe, causing profound AA and RA. The removed brain structures included the hippocampus, the amygdala, and the parahippocampal gyrus, now called the medial temporal lobe memory system. HM was one of the most studied memory cases to date and started the examination of neurological structures in relation to memory.

Patients who have RA due to surgery are "P.B." and "F.C." who had unilateral removal of the medial areas in the left temporal lobe.

Controlled induction
Clinically induced RA has been achieved using different forms of electrical induction.
 Electroconvulsive therapy (ECT), used as a depression therapy, can cause impairments in memory. Tests show that information from days and weeks before the ECT can be permanently lost. The results of this study also show that severity of RA is more extreme in cases of bilateral ECT rather than unilateral ECT. Impairments can also be more intense if ECT is administered repetitively (sine wave simulation) as opposed to a single pulse (brief-pulse stimulation).
 Electroconvulsive shock (ECS): The research in this field has been advanced by using animals as subjects. Researchers induce RA in rats, for example, by giving daily ECS treatments. This is done to further understand RA.

Brain structures
The most commonly affected areas are associated with episodic and declarative memory such as the hippocampus, the diencephalon, and the temporal lobes.
 The hippocampus deals largely with memory consolidation, where information from the working memory and short-term memory is encoded into long-term storage for future retrieval. Amnesic patients with damage to the hippocampus are able to demonstrate some degree of unimpaired semantic memory, despite a loss of episodic memory, due to spared parahippocampal cortex. In other words, retrograde amnesics "know" about information or skill, but cannot "remember" how they do.
 The diencephalon and the surrounding areas' role in memory is not well understood. However, this structure appears to be involved in episodic memory recall. 
 The temporal lobes are essential for semantic and factual memory processing. Aside from helping to consolidate memory with the hippocampus, the temporal lobes are extremely important for semantic memory. Damage to this region of the brain can result in the impaired organization and categorization of verbal material, disturbance of language comprehension, and impaired long-term memory. The right frontal lobe is critical for the retrieval of episodic information, while the left frontal region is more active for the retrieval of semantic information. [56] Lesions in the right hemisphere and right frontal lobes result in the impaired recall of non-verbal material, such as music and drawings. Difficulties in studying this region of the brain extends to its duties in comprehension, naming objects, verbal memory, and other language functions.

Brain plasticity has helped explain the recovery process of brain damage induced retrograde amnesia, where neuro-structures use different neural pathways to avoid the damaged areas while still performing their tasks. Thus, the brain can learn to be independent of the impaired hippocampus, but only to a certain extent.
For example, older memories are consolidated over time and in various structures of the brain, including Wernicke's area and the neocortex, making retrieval through alternate pathways possible.

Diagnosis

Testing for retrograde amnesia
As previously mentioned, RA can affect people's memories in different degrees, but testing is required to help determine if someone is experiencing RA. Several tests exist, for example, testing for factual knowledge such as known public events. A problem with this form of testing is that people generally differ in their knowledge of such subjects. The tests also have to be changed regularly to adapt to the period of time patients have been alive, and include questions about autobiographical events that range in amount of detail. Due to the nature of the information being tested, it is often difficult to verify the accuracy of the memories being recalled, especially if they are from a distant past. One way to confirm information is by consulting close family members or caregivers. Another problem that arises is that this type of testing can result in a significant amount of data that needs to be processed and confirmed. Other ways to test someone is via autobiographical knowledge using the Autobiographical Memory Interview (AMI). A test that comprises names of relatives, personal information, and job history. The AMI was created by Kopelman, Wilson, and Baddeley (1990).  This information could help  determine if someone is experiencing RA and the degree of memory affected. Some researchers have found that the time interval after the head injury occurred did not seem to matter. The effect of the memory loss was the same no matter how long it had been after from the injury.

Brain abnormalities can be measured using magnetic resonance imaging (MRI),  computed tomography scan (CT) and electroencephalography (EEG), which can provide detailed information about specific brain structures. In many cases, an autopsy helps identify the exact brain region affected and the extent of the damage that caused RA once the patient has died.

There are some aspects essential to the patient that remain unaffected by RA. In many patients, their personality remains the same. Also, semantic memory, that is general knowledge about the world, is usually unaffected. However, episodic memory, which refers to one's life experiences, is impaired.

Another real life problem with RA is malingering, which is conceived as the rational output of a neurologically normal brain aiming at the surreptitious achievement of a well identified gain. Since it is common for people who have committed a crime to report having RA for that specific event in order to avoid their punishment, the legal system has pushed for the creation of a standardized test of amnesia. However, since most cases differ in onset, duration, and content forgotten, this task has shown to be a rather complex one.

Spontaneous recovery
When someone has RA, their memory cannot be recovered by simply being informed about their personal experiences and their identity. This is called reminder effect or reminder treatment. The reminder effect consists of re-exposing the patient to past personal information, which cannot reverse RA. Thus, reminding the patient about details of their life has no scientific bearings on recovering memory. Fortunately, memory can be and usually is recovered due to spontaneous recovery and plasticity.

Case studies
Since researchers are interested in examining the effects of disrupted brain areas and conducting experiments for further understanding of an unaffected, normal brain, many individuals with brain damage have volunteered to undergo countless tests to advance our scientific knowledge of the human brain. For example, Henry Molaison (HM) was someone with significant brain damage and participated in a lot of neurological research. Furthermore, he was also the most tested person in neuropsychology. All living people who participate are referred to in literature using only their initials to protect privacy.

Each case of RA has led to different symptoms and durations, where some patients have exhibited an inability to describe future plans, whether in the near future (e.g., this afternoon) or in the distant future (e.g., next summer) because of their inability to consolidate memories. Furthermore, researchers have also found that some patients can identify themselves and loved ones in photographs, but cannot determine the time or place the photo was taken. It has also been found that patients with RA greatly differ from the general population in remembering past events.

A few case examples are:
 After a head injury, AB had to relearn personal information. Many of AB's habits had also changed.
 Patient CD reported disorientation of place and time following his injuries as well as relearning previously learned information and activities (e.g., using a razor).
 EF was examined and found to be very confused about social norms (e.g., appropriate attire outside his home). EF exhibited memory loss of his personal experiences (e.g., childhood), and the impaired ability to recognize his wife and parents.
 JG is the first recorded patient with isolated RA.
 GH, a mother and a wife, had surgery in August 2002. When GH woke up after the surgery, she believed it was May 1989. Due to her amnesia, GH experienced great difficulty in her social environment, being overwhelmed by relationships to others.
 DH, a learning disabilities instructor and husband, sustained a closed head injury. He did not show any normal signs of memory loss but he could not recall anything prior to the accident.
 CDA is a 20-year-old man who fell and experienced head trauma after being unconscious for a little less than an hour. He had a self-identity loss and a retrograde deficit limited to the autobiographical events 5 years before the trauma. He often showed signs of spontaneous speech that was iterative and sometimes incoherent. When he saw his family and friends, he was shocked at how old they looked because he remembered them from 5 years earlier. This case also included amnesia for procedural skills like the fear of shaving or driving, which ultimately was overcome. There were no psychological, neuropsychological, or brain damage problems. His recovery of memory was progressive and spontaneous, where after several months the amnesia was limited to the two years preceding the trauma. This was a classic case of PRA. [57]
 GC was a 38 year old accountant that was found in a town square unable to remember anything about himself and unaware of where he was and how he got there. He was eventually able to recall basic information about himself and his family, but could not recall emotionally charged autobiographical events pertaining to the last 7 years of his life. Within 3–4 days, it was determined that his autobiographical amnesia was clearly and strictly selective for professional events, as he could remember everything that was not related to his job. It was ultimately learned that the job had created severe emotional stress and anxiety due to the extreme hours that triggered a sudden fugue state. He was eventually able to recover most of his memories minus a single work event where he had stolen money from the company. This was a classic case of psychogenic amnesia. [57]
 AF is a 15-year-old boy who hit his head and lost consciousness. He could not remember anything but was able to play songs on the piano, showing that his procedural memory was still intact. He gradually recovered some memories within the first 2–3 days but had autobiographical amnesia as well as significant memory loss for famous public facts and events for the 2 years prior to the injury. [57]

Although it may seem that people living with brain damage have great difficulty continuing the usual day-to-day aspects, they still can accomplish many feats. People with RA are able to lead a normal life. For instance, KC is a man who has many functional aspects intact; normal intelligence, unaffected perceptual and linguistic skills, short-term memory, social skills, and reasoning abilities. All of these things are necessary in everyday life and contribute to normal living. KC also is fully capable of scripted activities (e.g., making reservations or changing a flat tire).
In addition, patient HC successfully graduated high school and continued into post-secondary studies, an obvious accomplishment despite her condition. DH relearned his childhood memories from his parents and can retell the stories, but cannot recall specifics other than what has been told to him.

Other forms of amnesia
Other forms of amnesia exist and may be confused with RA. For instance, anterograde amnesia (AA) is the inability to learn new information. This describes a problem encoding, storing, or retrieving information that can be used in the future. It is important to note that these two conditions can, and often do both occur in the same patient simultaneously, but are otherwise separate forms of amnesia.

RA can also be an inherent aspect of other forms of amnesia, namely transient global amnesia (TGA). TGA is the sudden onset of AA and RA caused by a traumatic event, however it is short lived, typically lasting only 4 to 8 hours. TGA is very difficult to study because of the patients' quick recovery. This form of amnesia, like AA, remains distinct from RA.

Post-traumatic amnesia (PTA) is a state of confusion that occurs immediately following a traumatic brain injury in which the injured person is disoriented and unable to remember events that occur after the injury.

Psychogenic amnesia, or dissociative amnesia, is a memory disorder characterized by sudden retrograde autobiographical memory loss, said to occur for a period of time ranging from hours to years.

See also
 Amnesia
 Anterograde amnesia
 Dissociative amnesia
 Scott Bolzan – One of the most severe cases of retrograde amnesia on record

References

External links

 Journal of Neuroscience
 The strange case of Jonathan Overfeld from The State We're In radio show 

Amnesia